James Edward Lee (born 23 December 1988, Sheffield, South Yorkshire, England) is an English first-class cricketer, who played for Yorkshire County Cricket Club. He is a left-handed batsman and a right-arm medium-fast bowler.

Lee made his first-class cricket debut for Yorkshire during the 2006 season. He remains a part of the Second XI team. Lee was a tail-end batsman for the first team and remains in that position for the Second XI. He was on the defeated Second XI Trophy final side during the 2006 season. He was a member of the England Under-19 Squad for the 2008 Under-19 World Cup. He has played six times for England Under-19s in One Day Internationals.

References

External links
 

1988 births
Living people
English cricketers
Yorkshire cricketers
Leeds/Bradford MCCU cricketers
Cricketers from Sheffield
Suffolk cricketers
English cricketers of the 21st century